Oligospira is a genus of air-breathing land snails, terrestrial pulmonate gastropod mollusks in the family Acavidae. These snails are endemic to Sri Lanka.

Three species are recognized. They have relatively round shells with flat tops.

Species
 Oligospira polei (Collet, 1899)
 Oligospira skinneri (Reeve, 1854)
 Oligospira waltoni (Reeve, 1842)

References

External links
Photos of Oligospira waltoni Deniyaya, Sri Lanka